Harold Austin Wood (February 10, 1885 – May 18, 1955) was a professional baseball player. He played two games in Major League Baseball in 1903 with the Cincinnati Reds, one as a left fielder and one as a right fielder.

For his career, he collected no hits in three at bats with one walk. At 18, he was the second-youngest player in the National League during the 1903 season.

An alumnus of the University of Maryland, he was born in Waterville, Maine and later died in Bethesda, Maryland at the age of 70.

References

External links

Major League Baseball outfielders
Cincinnati Reds players
Baltimore Orioles (IL) players
Birmingham Barons players
Winnipeg Maroons (baseball) players
Baseball players from Maine
University of Maryland, Baltimore alumni
People from Waterville, Maine
1885 births
1955 deaths